Kalmak-e Gelal (also Romanized as Kalmak-e Gelāl or Kalmake Gelâl; also known as Kalmūk) is a village in Chin Rural District, Ludab District, Boyer-Ahmad County, Kohgiluyeh and Boyer-Ahmad Province, Iran. At the 2006 census, its population was 28, in 5 families.

References 

Populated places in Boyer-Ahmad County